Anolis viridulus is a species of lizard in the family Dactyloidae. The species is found in Cuba.

References

Anoles
Reptiles described in 2022
Endemic fauna of Cuba
Reptiles of Cuba
Taxa named by Gunther Köhler
Taxa named by Stephen Blair Hedges